The Goodwin Buckshot is an American powered parachute that was designed and produced by FL Goodwin of Phoenix, Arizona and introduced in 1998.

The aircraft was distributed by Paraborne Aviation of Kissimmee, Florida. The Buckshot is out of production.

Design and development
The aircraft was designed as a US FAR 103 Ultralight Vehicles two-seat trainer. It features a parachute-style high-wing, two seats in side-by-side configuration, tricycle landing gear and a single engine in pusher configuration. The standard engines supplied were the  2si 460F-45 and the  Zenoah G-50 engine, although any light two-cylinder, two-stroke engine can be used.

The aircraft is built from bolted-together anodized aluminum tubing to save weight. Inflight steering is accomplished via foot pedals that actuate the canopy brakes, creating roll and yaw. On the ground the aircraft has tiller-controlled nosewheel steering. The main landing gear does not incorporate suspension and the aircraft relies on large tundra tires to provide this.

Specifications (Buckshot)

References

1990s United States ultralight aircraft
Single-engined pusher aircraft
Powered parachutes